David "Dai" Edwards (21 March 1896 – 24 August 1960) was an international rugby forward who played rugby union for Glynneath and rugby league with Rochdale Hornets. He won a single cap for Wales under the rugby union code and then represented his country at rugby league in two matches between 1923 and 1925.

Rugby career
Edwards' rugby career was interrupted by the outbreak of World War I, in which Edwards fought for his country serving in the Welsh Guards. On the resumption of club rugby in 1919, Edwards rejoined his local team Glynneath, and was given the captaincy of the club in the 1919/1920 season. He retained the captaincy the following season, and in 1921 he won his first and only international cap as a rugby union player. Edwards won his cap for the opening game of the 1921 Five Nations Championship, an encounter with England at Twickenham. Wales suffered from several injuries to players during the game and were comprehensively beaten. Edwards was not reselected for any of the remaining games of the tournament.

In 1921, Edwards surrendered his amateur status by joining professional rugby league team, Rochdale Hornets. His first match for the Hornets was on 27 August against Swinton. He won two rugby league caps for Wales as a rugby league international, both games against England in 1923 and in 1925. Edwards played right-, i.e. number 12, in Rochdale Hornets' 10–9 victory over Hull F.C. in the 1922 Challenge Cup Final during the 1921–22 season at Headingley Rugby Stadium, Leeds on Saturday 6 May 1922, in front of a crowd of 32,596. Returning to Wales in the late 1920s, he coached Rhigos RFC, until he was stopped by the Welsh Rugby Union due to his background as a professional league player. He was however allowed to play for Rhigos during the Second World War.

International matches played
Wales (rugby union)
 1921

Wales (rugby league)
 1923, 1925

Bibliography

References

1896 births
1960 deaths
British Army personnel of World War I
Dual-code rugby internationals
Glynneath RFC players
Neath RFC players
Rhigos RFC players
Rochdale Hornets players
Rugby league forwards
Rugby league players from Neath Port Talbot
Rugby union forwards
Rugby union players from Glynneath
Wales international rugby union players
Wales national rugby league team players
Welsh Guards soldiers
Welsh rugby league players
Welsh rugby union players